Padilla javana is the only species of jumping spider in the genus Padilla which occurs on Java, with most others found in Madagascar, and one in China.

Description
The cephalothorax is flat and long, with the thorax much longer than the head part. It is of a leathery dark brown, with the cephalus and the sides black. On the thorax there is a broad median yellow stripe, edged with yellow hairs. The abdomen is smooth and black with a vague median stripe. The front legs are very robust and dark, with yellowish tips. All other legs are pale yellow. The male lacks the characteristic process of the chelicera found in most other males of the genus Padilla.

Footnotes

References
  (2000): An Introduction to the Spiders of South East Asia. Malaysian Nature Society, Kuala Lumpur.
  (2007): The world spider catalog, version 8.0. American Museum of Natural History.

Salticidae
Spiders of Indonesia
Spiders described in 1900